Culladia hastiferalis is a moth in the family Crambidae. It was described by Francis Walker in 1866. It is found on Borneo, Sumatra, Java, Sulawesi, the Moluccas, New Guinea, Taiwan, the Philippines (Luzon) and Australia, where it has been recorded from Northern Territory and Queensland.

References

Crambini
Moths described in 1866
Moths of Asia
Moths of Oceania